The Nigeria Commodities Exchange (NCX) is (besides the Nigerian Stock Exchange) one of two principal stock exchanges in Nigeria.  It is located in Abuja, the country's capital, and it was founded in 1998.

The NCX is primarily involved with the trading of commodities such as maize, sorghum and millet, as opposed to trading in securities such as bonds and company stock.

The Nigeria Commodity Exchange has concluded plans to set up a market information system for 12 commodity markets in the country. The Managing Director, NCX, Mrs. Zaheera Babaari said that within the next few months, the market information systems for the 12 major markets would be replicated in the 36 states and this would enable people get information about commodities prices as well as production of agricultural produce.

See also

Economy of Nigeria
List of African stock exchanges

References

External links
ASCE - Abuja Securities and Commodities Exchange website
Commodity price listings

Economy of Nigeria
Stock exchanges in Nigeria
Commodity exchanges
Economy of Abuja
Financial services companies established in 1998
1998 establishments in Nigeria